The train crash at Stafford, England on 4 August 1990 resulted in the death of a train driver and injuries to 36 people.

The 11:36 pm empty coaching stock train from Stoke-on-Trent to Birmingham Soho TMD ran into the rear of the 10:18 pm express passenger train from Manchester Piccadilly to Penzance, which was standing in platform 4 at Stafford station. The empty train was signalled to draw up behind the express in order to clear the way for another train.

The driver of the empty train, who was the only fatality, was considered not to have kept a good lookout. This was possibly compounded by excessive working hours and by the alcohol that was subsequently found in his bloodstream.

The Rule Book was changed to avoid this situation. Now if a train is to be signalled into an occupied section and that train is not booked to call at that location, the driver must be first advised. Also before a train can be signalled behind another, the signal ahead of the stationary train must be at danger until the second train has come to a stand, to avoid potential 'over-reading' of the signal by the second driver.

See also

 List of British rail accidents

References

External links
Official accident report, courtesy of The Railways Archive

Railway accidents and incidents in Staffordshire
Railway accidents in 1990
1990 in England
Stafford
1990s in Staffordshire
Train collisions in England